George Glyn may refer to:

Barons
George Glyn, 1st Baron Wolverton, British banker
George Glyn, 2nd Baron Wolverton, British Liberal politician

Baronets
Sir George Glyn, 2nd Baronet (c. 1739–1814), of the Glyn baronets
Sir George Lewen Glyn, 4th Baronet (1804–1885), of the Glyn baronets
Sir George Turbervill Glyn, 5th Baronet (1841–1891), of the Glyn baronets

See also
Glyn (surname)